Erin Manning may refer to:

 Erin Manning (theorist) (born 1969), Canadian theorist
 Erin Manning (photographer), American photographer